Jane Featherstone (born 1969) is an English television producer and founder of Sister Pictures, a television production company. Prior to that, she was the chief executive of Kudos and co-chairman of Shine UK, now part of Endemol Shine Group.

Biography
Featherstone was educated at Old Palace School and the University of Leeds.

Prior to joining Kudos, Featherstone produced the first two series of Touching Evil and the BBC2 film Sex ‘n’ Death. She worked at Hat Trick Productions where she worked on Whose Line Is It Anyway?, Have I Got News For You, and Drop The Dead Donkey.

Featherstone joined Kudos in 2000 as Head of Drama. She became Creative Director in 2008 and the company's Chief Executive in 2011. Whilst at Kudos, she executive produced Spooks, Life on Mars, Ashes to Ashes,  Utopia, The Tunnel, and The Smoke. Most recently she has executive produced River by Abi Morgan for BBC1/Netflix, Humans written by Jon Brackley and the Spooks movie The Greater Good.

Featherstone founded independent production company Sister Pictures in November 2015 to develop stories for UK and international audiences. Sister's current projects include The Split by Abi Morgan for BBC 1, Clean Break for ITV 1 starring Sheridan Smith, The Power, and The Bisexual for Channel 4. Sister Pictures is co-producer of Flowers for Channel 4 and Broadchurch for ITV.

Featherstone's other credits include  Mayday (BBC1) and series 1 and 2 of The Hour (BBC2), Hustle (BBC1), The Fixer (ITV1), Tsunami: The Aftermath for HBO and BBC2, and Chernobyl (miniseries) for HBO.

She later served as an executive producer for the BBC medical comedy drama series This Is Going to Hurt

Awards
 Fellow of the Royal Television Society (2010)
 Best Contribution to the Medium Award, Women in Film and TV awards (2007)

References

External links
 
 BAFTA Guru – Jane Featherstone's 2017 Television Lecture (recorded 30 October 2017)

English television producers
British women television producers
People from Bridge of Allan
1969 births
Living people
Alumni of the University of Leeds